Aurantimonas endophytica is a short-rod-shaped, aerobic and motile bacteria from the genus of Aurantimonas which has been isolated from the roots of the plant Anabasis elatior in Urumqi in China.

References

External links
Type strain of Aurantimonas endophytica at BacDive -  the Bacterial Diversity Metadatabase

Hyphomicrobiales
Bacteria described in 2016